Ghurban is a sub-district located in Khamir District, 'Amran Governorate, Yemen. Ghurban had a population of 4977 according to the 2004 census.

References 

Sub-districts in Khamir District